Spizocorys is a genus of African larks in the family Alaudidae found in southern and eastern Africa.

Taxonomy and systematics

Extant species
The genus contains seven extant species:
 Obbia lark (Spizocorys obbiensis)
 Sclater's lark (Spizocorys sclateri)
 Stark's lark (Spizocorys starki) 
 Short-tailed lark (Spizocorys fremantlii) 
 Masked lark (Spizocorys personata)
 Botha's lark (Spizocorys fringillaris)
 Pink-billed lark (Spizocorys conirostris)

Former species
Formerly, some authorities classified the following species as belonging to the genus: 
 Raso lark (as Spizocorys razae)
 Blanford's lark (eremica) (as Spizocorys eremica)
 Athi short-toed lark (as Spizocorys athensis)

References

 
Bird genera
Taxonomy articles created by Polbot